Ernesto Ramos Antonini  (April 24, 1898 – January 9, 1963) was the President of the House of Representatives of Puerto Rico and co-founder of the Partido Popular Democrático de Puerto Rico (Popular Democratic Party of Puerto Rico).

Early years
Ramos Antonini was born into a poor family in Mayagüez, Puerto Rico. He was the youngest child of the marriage between Federico Ramos Escalera and Rosa Antonini Danseau. When he was three months old, the family moved to Ponce, Puerto Rico, where he spent the next 43 years of his life.  As a child, his parents taught him the importance of getting a good education.  During the day he dedicated himself to his school studies and during his free time he was taught how to play the piano by his father who happened to be a musician. He graduated from Ponce High School in 1918, at 19 years of age. After he graduated from high school, Ramos Antonini enrolled at the University of Puerto Rico in Río Piedras (which is now a part of San Juan) to study law.  He paid for his school tuition by playing piano at a local theatre and in 1922 earned his law degree. He returned to Ponce where he taught math, became president of the Ponce Municipal Assembly and established his law firm.

In 1937 he gained fame as a lawyer when he defended the members of the Puerto Rican Nationalist Party who were accused of breaking the law after permits issued by the Mayor of Ponce for a peaceful march in Ponce were withdrawn by the colonial governor of Puerto Rico at the time, General Blanton Winship. Upon the withdrawal of the permits, the police opened fire on the crowd in what became known as the Ponce massacre. He also became known as a defender of the working class by being active in the International Workers Congress. He appeared before the U.S. Congress and defended the Puerto Rican workers who were being abused by the American companies established in the island.

Political career
In 1924, Ramos Antonini joined the Union Party of Puerto Rico founded by Luis Muñoz Rivera, Rosendo Matienzo Cintrón, Antonio R. Barceló and José de Diego in 1904, which defended self-government (autonomy) at the time of his entrance to the party. In 1930, Ramos Antonini, along with Luis Muñoz Marín joined the Liberal Party of Puerto Rico, successor of the Union Party, but now defending the independence of Puerto Rico. In 1932, he was elected to the House of Representatives along with Muñoz Marín to the Senate.

In 1938, Ramos Antonini became one of the co-founders of the Popular Democratic Party of Puerto Rico and was elected to the House of Representatives as a member of that political organization in the 1940s general elections. In 1940 he lived at Calle Isabel #31 in Ponce. His wife was Josefina Buonomo. They later moved to today's Urbanización Floral Park in Hato Rey, a barrio of Río Piedras, which was still a town independent from San Juan. Their daughters names were Jannette and Ivette.

In 1945, he was named President of the House of Representatives, a position which he held until his death in 1963. Ernesto Ramos Antonini was buried at the Puerto Rico Memorial Cemetery in Carolina, Puerto Rico.

Laws created by Antonini
Among the many laws created by Antonini were the following:

 The law that created the Institute of Labor Relations
 The law that created the National Commission of Work Relations
 The Minimum Wage Law of 1956
 The creation of the Free Schools of Music (Escuela Libre de Música) of San Juan, Ponce, and Mayagüez.
 The creation of the Symphonic Orchestra of Puerto Rico
 The law creating the Music Conservatory of Puerto Rico

Later years
Ramos Antonini was married to educator Josefina Buonomo. They had two daughters together: Jeannette and Ivette. In 1952 the Constitution of Puerto Rico was adopted, creating the Commonwealth of Puerto Rico. He was a member of the Constitutional Convention of Puerto Rico. Together with Dr. Ricardo Alegría, he founded the Institute of Puerto Rican Culture. Ernesto Ramos Antonini died on January 9, 1963, in San Juan, Puerto Rico. He was buried at the Puerto Rico Memorial Cemetery in Carolina, Puerto Rico.

Legacy
The memory of Ramos Antonini has been honored by the government of Puerto Rico naming an avenue and public structures after him.  In Barceloneta, Puerto Rico there is an Ernesto Ramos Antonini theatre and there is a Museum of History located in the Plaza Ernesto Ramos Antonini in Mayagüez.  On December 18, 1997, the Government of Puerto Rico approved the Law Number 166 which proclaims every April 24 from then on to be known as "Ernesto Ramos Antonini Day". In Ponce, San Juan, Mayagüez, and Yauco, there are public specialized schools named after him; the Escuela Libre de Música Ernesto Ramos Antonini of San Juan features a life-sized bronze statue of him at its entrance. He is also honored at Ponce's Park of Illustrious Ponce Citizens. The main street in the El Tuque sector of Barrio Canas in Ponce is also named in his memory.

See also

 List of Puerto Ricans
 Corsican immigration to Puerto Rico

Notes

References

External links
Luis J. Ramos Antonini
El Nuevo Dia

1898 births
1963 deaths
Speakers of the House of Representatives of Puerto Rico
Popular Democratic Party members of the House of Representatives of Puerto Rico
People from Mayagüez, Puerto Rico
Puerto Rican people of Corsican descent
Politicians from Ponce
University of Puerto Rico alumni
20th-century American politicians
American people of Italian descent